In enzymology, a ribosylpyrimidine nucleosidase is an enzyme that catalyzes the chemical reaction

a pyrimidine nucleoside + H2O  D-ribose + a pyrimidine base

Thus, the two substrates of this enzyme are pyrimidine nucleoside and H2O, whereas its two products are D-ribose and pyrimidine base.

This enzyme belongs to the family of hydrolases, specifically those glycosylases that hydrolyse N-glycosyl compounds.  The systematic name of this enzyme class is pyrimidine-nucleoside ribohydrolase. Other names in common use include N-ribosylpyrimidine nucleosidase, pyrimidine nucleosidase, N-ribosylpyrimidine ribohydrolase, pyrimidine nucleoside hydrolase, RihB, YeiK, and nucleoside ribohydrolase.  This enzyme participates in purine metabolism and pyrimidine metabolism.

Structural studies

References

 
 
 
 

EC 3.2.2
Enzymes of known structure